Ma'soumeh Dadehbala (10 April 1942 – 20 January 1990), known professionally as Hayedeh, was an Iranian singer with a contralto vocal range. Known for her wide range of voice, her career spanned over two decades, and she has been widely described as one of the most popular and influential musicians of Iran.

Early life and career

Ma'soumeh Dadehbala was born on 10 April 1942 in Tehran. She was the elder sister of another popular singer Mahasti.

Her professional career began in 1968 as a singer on a Persian traditional music program in Radio Tehran called "Golhâye Rangârang" ( "Colorful Flowers") directed by Davoud Pirnia.

Hayedeh studied Avaz (Persian vocal music) with the Persian violinist and composer Ali Tajvidi.

"Azadeh" (1968), which was composed by Ali Tajvidi, with lyrics by Rahi Moayeri, was Hayedeh's first official hit and debut also. It was first performed in 1968 on Radio Tehran with the Gol-ha Orchestra. In this year she released another titled Raftam (1968).

In the 1970s, Hayedah added Persian pop music to her classical Persian repertoire. In this period Hayedeh worked with several songwriters, such as Fereydoun Khoshnoud, Jahanbakhsh Pazouki, Anoushiravan Rohani and Mohammad Heydari. "Bezan Tar", "Gol-e Sang", "Nowrouz Aamad", and "Soghati" were among her works during this period.

Hayedeh has a younger sister Mahasti whom she has recorded duets with such as "Doa & Delam Mikhad" (I pray and I want) it was successful for release.

After the revolution and leaving Iran

On 29 August 1978, shortly before the Islamic Revolution in Iran, Hayedeh immigrated to the United Kingdom. She stayed there for three years and moved to the United States in 1982 to continue her job.

Caltex Records, an Iranian recording label, supported Hayedeh in her career.

Hayedeh lived in Los Angeles from 1982 until the end of her life. The area became a hub for the Persian (Iranian) community in Southern California since the 1980s.

Hayedeh released many successful albums during this time, and all her songs were bootlegged in Iran. Hayedeh's political and nostalgic songs such as "Rouzaye Roshan", "Ghesseyeh Man", "Zendegi" became very popular with the Iranian exile community.

Her songwriters and producers in the United States were mostly Sadegh Nojouki and Mohammad Heydari. Songwriters she worked with were Ardalan Sarfaraz, Homa Mir-Afshar and Bijan Samandar. Songwriter who wrote more than 30 of Hayedeh's songs and hits was her best friend Leila Kasra (a.k.a. Hedieh), who was featured in many of her albums reciting her poems. During her exile, Hayedeh regularly appeared on the Los Angeles-based Persian-language TV channels IRTV, Jaam-E-Jam and Jonbesh TV.

Death and burial

On 20 January 1990, the day after a performance at the Casablanca Club, near San Francisco, California, Hayedeh died from a heart attack. She was 47 years old. She had a history of diabetes and hypertension.

Thousands of fans attended Hayedeh's funeral in Los Angeles. On 24 January 1990, she was buried at the Westwood Village Memorial Park Cemetery in Los Angeles, California. She had been recording an album shortly before her death and was due to finish recording it after she returned from her concert in San Francisco.

Legacy
Hayedeh's albums are still best sellers and her songs are played on Persian TV and radio channels outside Iran. Many of her songs are sung by Iranian pop singers. Houshmand Aghili performed Hayedeh's "Sarab", Parviz Rahman Panah remixed her "Saal", Shahla Sarshar performed a tragic song called "In Memory of Hayedeh", singer Amir did a cover of Hayedeh's song "Soghati" in 2008 and Mahasti performed three songs in memory of her late sister.

 
According to Prof. Erik Nakhjavani in Encyclopædia Iranica: "Analogous to Delkash, before her, Hayedeh sang with technical authority and passionate energy. Her laryngeal control made it possible for her to produce a series of graceful vibrato and glissando vocalizations required by the Avaz Persian vocal music. She could smoothly pass from the upper reaches of her alto voice to the lower, fuller, and darker range of the contralto. This mixture of strong laryngeal strength and learned vocal technique gave her alto-contralto voice a rare, powerful resonance and texture in the performance of the Avaz. Furthermore an acute sense for musical timing, the rhythmic flow of vocal music, affective musical phrasing, and poetic delivery enabled her to express and interpret effectively any songs she sang."

Iranian pianist and journalist Pejman Akbarzadeh made a documentary Hayedeh: Legendary Persian Diva about Hayedeh which was screened in Amsterdam in January 2009 for the first time. The documentary had its US premiere in May 2009 at the Noor Iranian Film Festival in Los Angeles and nominated as the Best Documentary at the festival. The film was also screened at 9th International Exile Film Festival (Sweden) and 4th Iranian Film Festival in the Netherlands. Tehran-based FARS News Agency (close to the Islamic Revolutionary Guard) cited the documentary as a film on the "Corrupt monarchist singer Hayedeh". The documentary was released on DVD on 20 January 2010, the 20th anniversary of Hayedeh's death, by "Persian Dutch Network" in Amsterdam. Various American universities have streamed the documentary on their server for educational purposes as well.

In April 2019 the Los Angeles City Council recognized and celebrated Hayedeh, one of the most celebrated singers in Persian culture.

Partial discography

Studio albums
 Azadeh (1968)
 Raftam (1968)
 Nasepasi (1969)
 Afsaneh Shirin (1970) – with Shajarian
 Yaarab (1982)
 Hamkhooneh (1984) – with Viguen
 Shabeh Eshgh (1985)
 Shanehayat (1986)
 Sogand (1988)
 Safar (1988) – with Moein
 Ey Zendegi Salaam (1989)
 Golhayeh Ghorbat (1990) – with Moein
 Bezan Taar (1991)
 Kharabati (1991)
 Golvaazheh (1991)
 Khoda Hafez (1991)
 Paadeshahe Khoobaan (1992)
 Roozaayeh Roshan (1992)
 Shabeh Asheghan – with Sattar
 Naa Shanidehaa
 Faryad
 Bolboli Ke Khaamosh Shod
 Aamadanet Mahaaleh
 Owje Sedaa
 Mehmaan
 Hayf
 Taranehyeh Saal

Compailation
 Best of Hayedeh
 40 Golden Hits of Hayedeh
 40 Hayedeh Golden Songs, Vol I
 Hayedeh Golden Songs, Vol II
 Shirin Jaan, Hayedeh 4
 Dashtestani, Hayedeh 5 
 Afsaneh Shirin, Hayedeh 8''

See also

 Persian classical music
 Music of Iran
 Persian women musicians
 Persian pop music
 Mahasti

References

External links

 Documentary website (in English & Persian)
 Hayedeh live performance, National TV, Tehran, 1977 (Video)
 
 

Contraltos
1942 births
1990 deaths
People from Tehran
Singers from Tehran
Iranian folk singers
Musicians from Tehran
Women singers on Golha
Caltex Records artists
Taraneh Records artists
Persian-language singers
Iranian classical singers
Iranian women pop singers
Iranian singer-songwriters
American women pop singers
20th-century American singers
American people of Iranian descent
20th-century Iranian women singers
20th-century American women singers
Iranian emigrants to the United States
Burials at Westwood Village Memorial Park Cemetery
Exiles of the Iranian Revolution in the United States